(North Frisian Polweerm) is a municipality in the district of  Nordfriesland, in Schleswig-Holstein, Germany.

The municipality is located on the island of Pellworm – one of the North Frisian Islands on the North Sea coast of Germany. Its area is 37 km², and its population is roughly 1,200. A landmark is the Old Church with its Arp Schnitger organ from about 1710.

In medieval times Pellworm was a part of the larger island of Strand which was torn into pieces in the disastrous Burchardi flood in 1634. Other remnants of Strand are Nordstrand and the Halligen. All these belonged to the historical region of Uthlande.

Pellworm is accessible by a ferry departing from the neighbouring peninsula of Nordstrand (which is in turn connected with the mainland by a road causeway).

The island hosts one of the largest hybrid renewable energy plants in Europe. It combines 2.7 MW solar panels; 5.7 MW wind energy and 0.5 MW of biogas digestion plant with to provide over 700 MWh/year of electricity. Since the island's average electricity production capacity exceeds its average demand multiple times, yet there is a time mismatch between the two, this site was chosen for EU's largest stationary energy storage facility ca. 2015. In 2022 the island hosts a 560 kW/560 kWh lithium-ion battery, a 200 kW/1600 kWh vanadium flow battery, and a thermal storage unit.  Gildemeister, now Cellcube part of Enerox, supplied the vanadium battery.

Together with several smaller islands, Pellworm forms the Amt of Pellworm.

References 

 
North Frisian Islands
Nordfriesland
Islands of Schleswig-Holstein